Deputy Prime Minister of the Republic of Poland is the deputy of the Prime Minister of Poland and member of the Council of Ministers of the Republic of Poland. They can also be one of the Ministers of the Republic of Poland. The Constitution of the Republic does not limit the number of persons who can hold the position of deputy prime minister simultaneously.

Deputy prime ministers of the communist Poland

People's Poland (1944–1952)
 Polish Committee of National Liberation
 Wanda Wasilewska (b. 1905 – d. 1964), Deputy Chairman of the Polish Committee of National Liberation from 21 July 1944 to 31 December 1944
 Andrzej Witos (b. 1878 – d. 1973), Deputy Chairman of the Polish Committee of National Liberation from 21 July 1944 to 9 October 1944
 Stanisław Janusz (b. 1890 – d. 1970), Deputy Chairman of the Polish Committee of National Liberation from 9 October 1944 to 31 December 1944
 Provisional Government of the Republic of Poland
 Stanisław Janusz (b. 1890 – d. 1970), Deputy Prime Minister from 31 December 1944 to 28 June 1945
 Władysław Gomułka (b. 1905 – d. 1982), from 31 December 1944 to 28 June 1945 
 Provisional Government of National Unity
 Władysław Gomułka (b. 1905 – d. 1982), from 28 June 1945 to 6 February 1947
 Stanisław Mikołajczyk (b. 1901 – d. 1966), from 28 June 1945 to 6 February 1947
 First Cabinet of Józef Cyrankiewicz
 Władysław Gomułka (b. 1905 – d. 1982), from 6 February 1947 to 20 January 1949
 Antoni Korzycki (b. 1904 – d. 1990), from 6 February 1947 to 20 November 1952
 Aleksander Zawadzki (b. 1899 – d. 1964), from 20 January 1949 to 10 June 1949 i from 28 April 1950 to 20 November 1952
 Hilary Minc (b. 1905 – d. 1974), from 20 April 1949 to 20 November 1952 
 Hilary Chełchowski (b. 1908 – d. 1983), from 10 June 1950 to 20 November 1952
 Stefan Jędrychowski (b. 1910 – d. 1996), from 12 December 1951 to 20 November 1952 
 Tadeusz Gede (b. 1911 – d. 1982), from 30 June 1952 to 20 November 1952

People's Republic of Poland (1952–1989)
 Cabinet of Bolesław Bierut
 Józef Cyrankiewicz (b. 1911 – d. 1989), from 20 November 1952 to 18 March 1954
 Władysław Dworakowski (b. 1908 – d. 1976), from 20 November 1952 to 18 March 1954
 Tadeusz Gede (b. 1911 – d. 1982), from 20 November 1952 to 18 March 1954
 Piotr Jaroszewicz (b. 1909 – d. 1992), from 20 November 1952 to 18 March 1954
 Stefan Jędrychowski (b. 1910 – d. 1996), from 20 November 1952 to 18 March 1954
 Hilary Minc (b. 1905 – d. 1974), from 20 November 1952 to 18 March 1954
 Zenon Nowak (b. 1905 – d. 1980), from 20 November 1952 to 18 March 1954
 Konstanty Rokossowski (b. 1896 – d. 1968), from 20 November 1952 to 18 March 1954
 First Cabinet of Józef Cyrankiewicz
 Jakub Berman (b. 1901 – d. 1984), from 18 March 1954 to 4 May 1956
 Hilary Minc (b. 1905 – d. 1974), I zastępca Premiera from 18 March 1954 to 10 October 1956
 Zenon Nowak (b. 1905 – d. 1980), II zastępca Premiera from 18 March 1954 to 24 October 1956 
 Tadeusz Gede (b. 1911 – d. 1982), from 18 March 1954 to 24 October 1956
 Stefan Jędrychowski (b. 1910 – d. 1996), from 18 March 1954 to 24 October 1956
 Konstanty Rokossowski (b. 1896 – d. 1968), from 18 March 1954 to 13 November 1956
 Piotr Jaroszewicz (b. 1909 – d. 1992), from 18 March 1954 to 20 February 1957
 Stanisław Łapot (b. 1914 – d. 1972), from 14 May 1954 to 20 February 1957
 Franciszek Jóźwiak (b. 1895 – d. 1966), from 16 April 1955 to 20 February 1957
 Eugeniusz Stawiński (b. 1905 – d. 1989), from 4 May 1956 to 20 February 1957
 Zenon Nowak (b. 1905 – d. 1980), from 24 October 1956 to 20 February 1957
 Stefan Ignar (b. 1908 – d. 1992), from 24 October 1956 to 20 February 1957
 Second Cabinet of Józef Cyrankiewicz
 Eugeniusz Stawiński (b. 1905 – d. 1989), from 27 February 1957 to 15 May 1961
 Zenon Nowak (b. 1905 – d. 1980), from 27 February 1957 to 15 May 1961
 Stefan Ignar (b. 1908 – d. 1992), from 27 February 1957 to 15 May 1961
 Piotr Jaroszewicz (b. 1909 – d. 1992), from 27 February 1957 to 15 May 1961
 Eugeniusz Szyr (b. 1915 – d. 2000), from 27 October 1959 to 15 May 1961
 Julian Tokarski (b. 1903 – d. 1977), from 27 October 1959 to 15 May 1961
 Third Cabinet of Józef Cyrankiewicz
 Stefan Ignar (b. 1908 – d. 1992), from 18 May 1961 to 24 June 1965
 Piotr Jaroszewicz (b. 1909 – d. 1992), from 18 May 1961 to 24 June 1965
 Zenon Nowak (b. 1905 – d. 1980), from 18 May 1961 to 24 June 1965
 Eugeniusz Szyr (b. 1915 – d. 2000), from 18 May 1961 to 24 June 1965
 Julian Tokarski (b. 1903 – d. 1977), from 18 May 1961 to 24 June 1965
 Franciszek Waniołka (b. 1912 – d. 1971), from 28 July 1962 to 24 June 1965
 Fourth Cabinet of Józef Cyrankiewicz
 Julian Tokarski (b. 1903 – d. 1977), from 25 June 1965 to 14 December 1965
 Zenon Nowak (b. 1905 – d. 1980), from 25 June 1965 to 22 December 1968
 Eugeniusz Szyr (b. 1915 – d. 2000), from 25 June 1965 to 22 December 1968
 Franciszek Waniołka (b. 1912 – d. 1971), from 25 June 1965 to 22 December 1968
 Stefan Ignar (b. 1908 – d. 1992), from 25 June 1965 to 27 June 1969
 Piotr Jaroszewicz (b. 1909 – d. 1992), from 25 June 1965 to 27 June 1969
 Fifth Cabinet of Józef Cyrankiewicz
 Stanisław Kociołek (b. 1933 – d. 2015), from 30 June 1970 to 23 December 1970
 Marian Olewiński (b. 1912 – d. 1982), from 28 June 1969 to 30 June 1970
 Piotr Jaroszewicz (b. 1909 – d. 1992), from 28 June 1969 to 23 December 1970
 Stanisław Majewski (b. 1915 – d. 1985), from 28 June 1969 to 23 December 1970 
 Eugeniusz Szyr (b. 1915 – d. 2000), from 28 June 1969 to 23 December 1970 
 Zdzisław Tomal (b. 1921 – d. 1984), from 28 June 1969 to 23 December 1970 
 Józef Kulesza (b. 1919 – d. 1985), from 6 March 1970 to 23 December 1970 
 Mieczysław Jagielski (b. 1924 – d. 1997), from 30 June 1970 to 23 December 1970
 First Cabinet of Piotr Jaroszewicz
 Kazimierz Olszewski (b. 1917 – d. 2014), from 29 March 1972 to 25 March 1976
 Józef Tejchma (b. 1927 – d. 2021), from 29 March 1972 to 25 March 1976
 Tadeusz Pyka (b. 1930 – d. 2009), from 23 October 1975 to 25 March 1976
 Stanisław Majewski (b. 1915 – d. 1985), from 23 December 1970 to 13 February 1971
 Eugeniusz Szyr (b. 1915 – d. 2000), from 23 December 1970 to 28 March 1972
 Jan Mitręga (b. 1917 – d. 2007), from 23 December 1970 to 21 February 1975
 Józef Kulesza (b. 1919 – d. 1985), from 23 December 1970 to 28 March 1972
 Zdzisław Tomal (b. 1921 – d. 1984), from 23 December 1970 to 25 March 1976
 Franciszek Kaim (b. 1919 – d. 1996), from 23 December 1970 to 25 March 1976
 Mieczysław Jagielski (b. 1924 – d. 1997), from 23 December 1970 to 25 March 1976
 Wincenty Kraśko (b. 1916 – d. 1976), from 13 February 1971 to 28 March 1972
 Franciszek Szlachcic (b. 1920 – d. 1990), from 29 May 1974 to 25 March 1976
 Alojzy Karkoszka (b. 1929 – d. 2001), from 28 May 1975 to 25 March 1976
 Tadeusz Wrzaszczyk (b. 1932 – d. 2002), from 23 October 1975 to 25 March 1976
 Second Cabinet of Piotr Jaroszewicz
 Kazimierz Olszewski (b. 1917 – d. 2014), from 27 March 1976 to 17 December 1977
 Józef Tejchma (b. 1927 – d. 2021), from 27 March 1976 to 8 February 1979
 Tadeusz Pyka (b. 1930 – d. 2009), from 27 March 1976 to 3 April 1980 
 Alojzy Karkoszka (b. 1929 – d. 2001), from 27 March 1976 to 2 December 1976
 Franciszek Kaim (b. 1919 – d. 1996), from 27 March 1976 to 8 February 1979
 Longin Cegielski (b. 1920 – d. 1987), from 27 March 1976 to 3 April 1980  
 Tadeusz Wrzaszczyk (b. 1932 – d. 2002), from 27 March 1976 to 3 April 1980 
 Mieczysław Jagielski (b. 1924 – d. 1997), from 27 March 1976 to 3 April 1980 
 Józef Kępa (b. 1928 – d. 1998), from 2 December 1976 to 8 February 1979
 Kazimierz Secomski (b. 1910 – d. 2002), from 2 December 1976 to 3 April 1980 
 Jan Szydlak (b. 1925 – 1997), from 2 December 1976 to 3 April 1980
 Cabinet of Edward Babiuch
 Tadeusz Pyka (b. 1930 – d. 2009), from 3 April 1980 to 24 August 1980
 Roman Malinowski (b. 1935 – d. 2021), from 3 April 1980 to 24 August 1980
 Tadeusz Wrzaszczyk (b. 1932 – d. 2002), from 3 April 1980 to 24 August 1980
 Kazimierz Barcikowski (b. 1927 – d. 2007), from 3 April 1980 to 24 August 1980 
 Mieczysław Jagielski (b. 1924 – d. 1997), from 3 April 1980 to 24 August 1980
 Cabinet of Józef Pińkowski
 Aleksander Kopeć (b. 1932 – d. 2015), from 24 August 1980 to 12 February 1981
 Roman Malinowski (b. 1935 – d. 2021), from 24 August 1980 to 12 February 1981
 Stanisław Mach (b. 1938), from 8 October 1980 to 12 February 1981
 Kazimierz Barcikowski (b. 1927 – d. 2007), from 24 August 1980 to 8 October 1980
 Tadeusz Grabski (b. 1929 – d. 1998), from 24 August 1980 to 8 October 1980
 Henryk Kisiel (b. 1921 – d. 2000), from 24 August 1980 to 12 February 1981
 Mieczysław Jagielski (b. 1924 – d. 1997), from 24 August 1980 to 12 February 1981
 Stanisław Kowalczyk (b. 1924 – d. 1998), from 8 October 1980 to 12 February 1981
 Jerzy Ozdowski (b. 1925 – d. 1994), from 21 November 1980 to 12 February 1981
 Cabinet of Wojciech Jaruzelski
 Stanisław Mach (b. 1938), from 12 February 1981 to 31 October 1981
 Andrzej Jedynak (b. 1932), from 12 February 1981 to 9 October 1982
 Roman Malinowski (b. 1935 – d. 2021), from 12 February 1981 to 12 November 1985
 Zbigniew Madej (b. 1932), from 12 June 1981 to 9 October 1982
 Janusz Obodowski (b. 1930 – d. 2011), from 31 July 1981 to 12 November 1985
 Zbigniew Szałajda (b. 1934), from 9 October 1982 to 12 November 1985
 Zbigniew Messner (b. 1929 – d. 2014), from 22 November 1983 to 12 November 1985
 Manfred Gorywoda (b. 1942), from 22 November 1983 to 12 November 1985
 Zenon Komender (b. 1923 – d. 1993), from 21 July 1982 to 12 November 1985
 Mieczysław Jagielski (b. 1924 – d. 1997), from 12 February 1981 to 31 July 1981
 Jerzy Ozdowski (b. 1925 – d. 1994), from 12 February 1981 to 21 July 1982
 Henryk Kisiel (b. 1921 – d. 2000), from 12 February 1981 to 12 June 1981
 Edward Kowalczyk (b. 1924 – d. 2000), from 31 October 1981 to 12 November 1985
 Mieczysław F. Rakowski (b. 1926 – d. 2008), from 12 February 1981 to 12 November 1985
 Cabinet of Zbigniew Messner
 Manfred Gorywoda (b. 1942), from 12 November 1985 to 23 October 1987
 Józef Kozioł (b. 1939), from 12 November 1985 to 14 October 1988
 Zbigniew Szałajda (b. 1934), from 12 November 1985 to 14 October 1988
 Zdzisław Sadowski (b. 1925 - d. 2018), from 23 October 1987 to 14 October 1988
 Zbigniew Gertych (b. 1922 – d. 2008), from 12 November 1985 to 16 April 1987
 Władysław Gwiazda (b. 1935 – d. 1998), from 12 November 1985 to 23 October 1987
 Cabinet of Mieczysław Rakowski
 Janusz Patorski (b. 1946), from 14 October 1988 to 1 August 1989
 Kazimierz Olesiak (b. 1937), from 14 October 1988 to 1 August 1989
 Ireneusz Sekuła (b. 1943 – d. 2000), from 14 October 1988 to 1 August 1989
 Cabinet of Tadeusz Mazowiecki
 Leszek Balcerowicz (b. 1947), from 12 September 1989 to 31 December 1989
 Czesław Janicki (b. 1926 – d. 2012), from 12 September 1989 to 31 December 1989
 Czesław Kiszczak (b. 1925 – d. 2015), from 12 September 1989 to 31 December 1989
 Jan Janowski (b. 1928 – d. 1998), from 12 September 1989 to 31 December 1989

Deputy prime ministers of the Third Polish Republic (1990–present)
There were no deputy prime ministers in the cabinet of Jan Olszewski and in the first cabinet of Waldemar Pawlak.

Timeline

Timeline

External links
 https://www.premier.gov.pl/en.html

 
Government of Poland
History of Poland (1989–present)
Prime
Government ministers of Poland

pl:Wicepremier